Booth is a small unincorporated community in Fort Bend County, Texas, United States. It is located along Farm to Market Road 2759 and the BNSF Railway southeast of Richmond, Texas. There are number of houses, an RV-park, a restaurant, a landscaping business and a historical marker in the area.

Geography
The BNSF Railway tracks run parallel to and south of FM 2759 through the area. Both railroad and highway come into Booth from the west-northwest. They curve slightly and leave Booth heading southeast. An historical marker is at the corner of FM 2759 and Agnes Road. The Old Trading Post restaurant is nearby. Agnes Road continues north-northeast  to the Riverbend RV Park; beyond that point it becomes a one-lane trail and dead ends before reaching the Brazos River.

History
The property on which today's community stands was granted to Henry Jones (1789-1861) in Stephen F. Austin's Texas colony. Freeman Irby Booth, a wealthy landowner who owned a cotton gin, general store, lumberyard and syrup mill, founded the settlement in the 1890s. The community received a post office in 1894. Two years later there was a school, Baptist church and 150 residents. By 1914, a population of about 300 was served by a bank and telephone connections. The community's segregated schools taught 85 white and 177 black students in 1926. From the mid-1920s through 1948, about 100 people lived in the settlement. During the 1940s Booth had a school and two churches but by the end of the decade there were only 40 persons living there. In the 1980s there were two businesses and by 1990 there were about 60 residents.

Government and infrastructure
Fort Bend County does not have a hospital district. OakBend Medical Center serves as the county's charity hospital which the county contracts with.

Education
Booth is zoned to schools in the Lamar Consolidated Independent School District. The schools include William C. Velazquez Elementary School, Reading Junior High School and George Ranch High School.

References

Unincorporated communities in Texas
Unincorporated communities in Fort Bend County, Texas
Greater Houston